María Elena Chapa Hernández (19 April 1944 – 9 August 2021) was a Mexican politician who served as a Deputy and as a Senator.

References

1944 births
2021 deaths
Members of the Senate of the Republic (Mexico)
Women members of the Senate of the Republic (Mexico)
Members of the Chamber of Deputies (Mexico)
Women members of the Chamber of Deputies (Mexico)
Members of the Congress of Nuevo León
20th-century Mexican politicians
20th-century Mexican women politicians
21st-century Mexican politicians
21st-century Mexican women politicians
Autonomous University of Nuevo León alumni
Academic staff of the Autonomous University of Nuevo León
Politicians from Nuevo León